Jade Gresham (born 24 August 1997) is an Australian rules footballer playing for the St Kilda Football Club in the Australian Football League (AFL). He was drafted as pick 18 in the 2015 AFL draft.

AFL career

2016 season 
He made his debut in round 1 of the 2016 AFL season against  at Adelaide Oval.

Gresham played 18 games in the 2016 AFL premiership season, finishing with 11 goals and an average of 15 disposals per game.

2017 season 
Prior to the 2017 season, Gresham signed a two-year contract extension with St Kilda, committing to the club until the end of the 2019 season.

Gresham played in all 22 games for the Saints in 2017. He kicked 30 goals and averaged 14 disposals.

2018 season 

2019 season 
Gresham played 19 of a possible 22 games in 2019 and began to assert himself as one of the Saints' best young players, averaging 22 disposals a game. Gresham signed a four-year contract extension in May 2019, to remain a Saint until at least the end of 2023.

2020 season 
The 2020 season was affected by Covid19 with the quarters reduced to 16 minutes after round one, and the regular season reduced to 17 matches per team. Gresham played the first 11 games of the season and was a key member of the Saints' midfield, but suffered a stress fracture in his back and took no further part in the 2020 campaign.

2021 season 

Gresham began the 2021 campaign strongly, playing the opening three rounds of the season, collecting 28 disposals against GWS and 29 disposals and a goal against Melbourne. In round three against Essendon, Gresham ruptured his achilies. The injury ruled him out of the remainder of the season as the tendon required surgery and nine months of recovery.

Personal life

Gresham is of Aboriginal Australian descent, hailing from the Yorta Yorta people. He and his mother, Michelle, played a key role in designing St Kilda's 2017 AFL Indigenous Round guernsey.

Gresham's father, Jamie, played u18s football with North Melbourne Football Club legend Brent Harvey. Gresham cited Harvey as a big influence on how he developed as a player before being drafted.

Career statistics
 Statistics are correct to the end of round 7, 2022

|-style="background-color: #EAEAEA"
! scope="row" style="text-align:center" | 2016
| style="text-align:center;"|
| 22 || 18 || 11 || 6 || 146 || 129 || 275 || 48 || 54 || 0.6 || 0.3 || 8.1 || 7.2 || 15.3 || 2.7 || 3.0 || 0
|-
! scope="row" style="text-align:center" | 2017
|style="text-align:center;"|
| 4 || 22 || 30 || 30 || 196 || 119 || 315 || 74 || 55 || 1.4 || 1.4 || 8.9 || 5.4 || 14.3 || 3.4 || 2.5 || 0
|-style="background-color: #EAEAEA"
! scope="row" style="text-align:center" | 2018
|style="text-align:center;"|
| 4 || 22 || 35 || 20 || 220 || 167 || 387 || 72 || 55 || 1.6 || 0.9 || 10.0 || 7.6 || 17.8 || 3.3 || 2.5 || 5
|- style="background-color: #EAEAEA"
! scope="row" style="text-align:center" | 2019
|style="text-align:center;"|
| 4 || 19 || 15 || 13 || 257 || 173 || 430 || 71 || 55 || 0.8 || 0.7 || 13.5 || 9.1 || 22.6 || 3.7 || 2.9 || 1
|-
! scope="row" style="text-align:center" | 2020
|
| 4 || 11 || 7 || 6 || 111 || 83 || 194 || 25 || 21 || 0.6 || 0.5 || 10.1 || 7.5 || 17.6 || 2.3 || 1.9 || 5
|- style="background-color: #EAEAEA"
! scope="row" style="text-align:center" | 2021
|style="text-align:center;"|
| 4 || 3 || 1 || 0 || 42 || 21 || 63 || 12 || 6 || 0.3 || 0.0 || 14.0 || 7.0 || 21.0 || 4.0 || 2.0 || 0
|-
! scope="row" style="text-align:center" | 2022
|
| 4 || 7 || 9 || 7 || 102 || 65 || 167 || 22 || 20 || 1.3 || 1.0 || 14.6 || 9.3 || 23.9 || 3.1 || 2.9 || 1
|- class="sortbottom"
! colspan=3| Career
! 102
! 108
! 82
! 1074
! 757
! 1831
! 324
! 266
! 1.1
! 0.8
! 10.5
! 7.4
! 18.0
! 3.2
! 2.6
! 12
|}

Notes

References

External links

1997 births
Living people
St Kilda Football Club players
Northern Knights players
Australian rules footballers from Victoria (Australia)
Indigenous Australian players of Australian rules football
Sandringham Football Club players